Manuele Blasi (born 17 August 1980) is an Italian former professional footballer who played a midfielder and now works as a coach.

Club career
Primarily a central midfielder, Blasi made his Serie A debut for A.S. Roma in a match against Piacenza on 22 January 2000. he also played for Lecce at Serie B before returned to Roma. In mid-2000 he was signed by Perugia at (first in co-ownership deal for a peppercorn of 1 million Italian lire; €516). At Perugia he played 46 Serie A matches. In June 2001, he was signed permanently for 18 billion lire (€9.296 million)), however, in terms of the signing of Giuseppe Cattivera also for 18 billion lire.

In July 2002, he was signed by Juventus for about €17.7 million, and loaned back to Perugia in the first season.

In the second season he joined Parma. He was suspended due to testing positive for nandrolone until March.

Juventus
Blasi returned to Juventus F.C. in 2004, under Fabio Capello, his coach at Roma; he received his first Italy call-up in August. In his first season with Juventus, he was often partnered with his former Roma teammate Emerson in the centre of the team's midfield, in Capello's 4–4–2 formation, fighting off competition from Stephen Appiah and Alessio Tacchinardi for a starting spot, and collecting 27 appearances as Juventus won the league title.

The following season, due to the injuries of Jonathan Zebina and Gianluca Pessotto, he often played as a right-back. Due to the arrival of Patrick Vieira and the emergence of Giorgio Chiellini, however, he often found a lack of first team opportunities both in midfield and defence, although he was awarded a new contract extension, which would keep him with the club until 2009. He made six starts for the club throughout the season, as the team won a second consecutive league title.

While waiting for the outcome of the 2006 Italian football scandal sentences, which ultimately saw Juventus relegated to Serie B and stripped of their previous two league titles due to their involvement in Calciopoli, Blasi joined Fiorentina on a loan with an option to buy, under Cesare Prandelli, who had previously also been his coach at Parma.

Napoli
Along with his former Juventus teammate Marcelo Zalayeta, Blasi was sold to newly promoted Serie A team Napoli for €1.4 million and €2.45 million respectively in co-ownership deal in the summer of 2007. He signed a five-year contract with the club. In June 2008, Napoli bought the remaining half of the player's registration rights from Juventus for €2.6 million.

On 31 August 2009, Blasi was loaned to Palermo after he had played the opening match of the season against Salernitana in the Coppa Italia on 16 August. On 20 May 2010, he joined A.C. Milan on loan exclusively for a three-game friendly tournament in the United States.

Lecce
On 27 January 2012, Blasi signed with Serie A side Lecce during the January transfer window.

Pescara
On 7 August 2012, Blasi joined the newly promoted Serie A side Delfino Pescara 1936 on a one-year deal.

Varese
Blasi joined Varese in 2013. He spent two seasons at the club and was released in 2015.

Chennaiyin
Blasi joined Indian club Chennaiyin FC in 2015 after the expiry of his contract at Varese. He was retained in 2016, after a short spell at Ischia Isolaverde.

International career
At youth level, Blasi played for the Italy U-15 team, the Italy U-16 team in 1997 UEFA European Under-16 Football Championship qualifying; the Italy U-18 team at the 1999 UEFA European Under-18 Football Championship, where they lost out to the Portugal U-18 side in the final; and the Italy U-20 team at the 2000 Toulon Tournament. He also played for the Italy U-21 side at the 2002 UEFA European Under-21 Football Championship, as a starter, due to the injury of Enzo Maresca; he partnered Matteo Brighi, Andrea Pirlo and Marco Marchionni in midfield, as they reached the semi-finals.

Manuele Blasi has also played for the Italian senior national team, for which he debuted on 18 August 2004 in a 2–0 friendly away loss against Iceland, at the age of 24, which was also manager Marcello Lippi's first match in charge of the national side. In total he made eight appearances for Italy between 2004 and 2005.

Style of play
A dynamic, tenacious, combative, and hard-working box-to-box midfielder, with notable stamina, a powerful shot from distance, and good ball-winning abilities, Blasi is a tactically versatile player, who is capable of playing as a right-sided or central midfielder, or even as a defensive midfielder in the centre of a three-man midfield, where his main function is to break down opposition plays and distribute the ball to his teammates. He is also known for his leadership and team spirit, although he has also drawn criticism at times from his managers for committing too many rash fouls and for having a tendency to pick up cards. Primarily a midfielder, throughout his career, he has also played as a right-back on occasion. Due to his technical characteristics and wide range of skills, he has also been deployed as a deep-lying playmaker in midfield, in front of the back-line, courtesy of his good feet, distribution, and ability to switch the play.

Coaching career 
On 12 January 2017, it was announced, that Blasi had joined Italian amateur club CPC 2005 Civitavecchia. However, in September 2017, he was announced as the club's new manager.

On 23 May 2019, Blasi was named manager of the Maltese club of Hamrun Spartans for his first professional experience as a manager. despite reaching the quarter finals in the Maltese FA Trophy, he has been sacked by the club on the beginning of February 2020.

Career statistics

Club

International

Honours
Chennaiyin FC
 Indian Super League: 2015

References

External links

Player profile on Napoli's official website 
Profile at Football.it 
Profile at La gazzetta dello Sport 
Profile at FIGC 

1980 births
Living people
People from Civitavecchia
Footballers from Lazio
Italian footballers
Italian expatriate footballers
Italy youth international footballers
Italy under-21 international footballers
Italy international footballers
A.S. Roma players
U.S. Lecce players
A.C. Perugia Calcio players
Parma Calcio 1913 players
Juventus F.C. players
ACF Fiorentina players
S.S.C. Napoli players
Palermo F.C. players
Delfino Pescara 1936 players
S.S.D. Varese Calcio players
Chennaiyin FC players
S.S. Ischia Isolaverde players
Serie A players
Serie B players
Serie C players
Indian Super League players
Expatriate footballers in India
Association football midfielders
Doping cases in association football
Italian sportspeople in doping cases
Sportspeople from the Metropolitan City of Rome Capital
Ayia Napa FC managers